Mistr Kampanus (román) is a Czech historical novel, written by Zikmund Winter. First published in 1906, the time depicted is the 17th century Battle of White Mountain.

1906 Czech novels
Historical novels